Zanane Rajsingh (born 15 March 1988 ) is an Indian film director. His debut film Beyond Blue - An Unnerving Tale of a Demented Mind, World Premiered on 16 May 2015 at 68th Festival de Cannes Marche du Film and the film was digitally released on Amazon Prime on December 2, 2019 He was recently awarded at 8th Gauravvanta Gujarati Awards for his contribution to Gujarat State for making films and taking Gujarati community worldwide. His next is a Gujarati film entitled 'Colorbaaj' which is based on underground parties in Ahmedabad  He is currently making a film on the topic of the climate change and its adverse effects titled It's Tomorrow - The Film. The film is written by Dr. Rajeshkumar Acharya and is being produced in the United States and India.

Early life and education
Zanane Rajsingh was born in Kolhapur, Maharashtra in 1988. He studied at National Public School, Indore and St. Pauls Higher Secondary School, Indore where his family resides in Harsiddhi Colony. His father works as a logistic manager in a private firm in Ahmedabad and his mother is a retired school teacher. He currently resides in Ahmedabad, Gujarat.

Career
In 2009, Zanane Rajsingh moved to Pune to work for a Multinational corporation where he continued working till 2011. While working there, he made a 16-minute short film A Candle Light Event based on the German bakery blast in Pune in 2010, which garnered appreciation from the film festivals.

In 2013, his psychological thriller short film Hastkala won a Best Screenplay award at the Dada Saheb Phalke Film Festival.  He then developed this short film into a feature film called as Beyond Blue - An Unnerving Tale of a Demented Mind which went on the floor by end of 2014. It had its world premiere at Cannes 2015. He is currently busy his directorial venture – It's Tomorrow, a climate fiction feature film on climate change which produced by an Indo-US based film production company Nanoland Group. He was awarded at 8th Gauravvanta Gujarati Award, 2015 for making films in Gujarat and representing Gujarat internationally.

Filmography

References

1988 births
Hindi-language film directors
Film directors from Maharashtra
Living people
Marathi people